Systems Research Institute may refer to:
 Systems Research Institute (India) – NPO in India
  – Institute of the Polish Academy of Sciences